is the professional name of , a Japanese writer and poet. Yamamoto has won the Shincho Prize for New Writers, the Akutagawa Prize, and the Izumi Kyoka Prize for Literature.

Biography
Yamamoto was born in Nakano, Tokyo and graduated from Atomi University in 1957. Her first three short stories, "Mahō," "Ame no Isu," and "Betei-san no Niwa" appeared in Shinchō magazine in March, July and November 1972 editions, respectively. "Rōjin no Kamo" was published August 1972 in the magazine Fūkei. These four stories were based on her experience living in Darwin, Northern Territory, Australia, where she had accompanied her husband in 1967. They later appeared in a collective issue. “Betty-san” became the title story for the English version, which was translated by Geraldine Harcourt and published in 1984 by Kodansha. 

She lives in Kamakura, Kanagawa with her husband. The couple has two grown daughters.

Literary awards
1972 4th Shinchō Prize for New Writers for Mahō (Powers)
1972 68th Akutagawa Prize for Betei-san no Niwa (Betty’s Garden)
1993 21st Izumi Kyōka Prize for Literature

Bibliography 
 Mahō (Powers)
 Ame no Isu (Chair in the Rain)
 Betei-san no Niwa (Betty-san)(1973), title story of four short stories
 Rōjin no Kamo (Father Gooze)
 Razō (1974), short stories
 Nichiyōbi no Kasa  (1976), poetry
 Yamamoto Michiko Shishū (1976), poetry
 Tenshi yo Umi ni mae  (1981), novel
 Umi no Satō-kibi  (1982), short stories
 Birejji no Ame  (1982), short stories

References

1936 births
People from Nakano, Tokyo
Japanese women novelists
Living people
Akutagawa Prize winners